Louisa Island is an island with a short sandy tombolo, located adjacent to the south-western coast of Tasmania, Australia. The irregularly shaped  island is part of the Maatsuyker Islands Group, and comprises part of the Southwest National Park and the Tasmanian Wilderness World Heritage Site.

Flora and fauna

The central parts of the island are lightly forested with Eucalyptus nitida and Eucalyptus ovata, with an understorey of Leptospermum scoparium and Melaleuca squarrosa.  Bracken covers areas subjected to recent fires.

The island is part of the Maatsuyker Island Group Important Bird Area, identified as such by BirdLife International because of its importance as a breeding site for seabirds. Recorded breeding seabird and wader species are the little penguin, short-tailed shearwater (206,000 pairs), fairy prion (400 pairs), common diving-petrel (1600 pairs), Pacific gull, sooty oystercatcher and pied oystercatcher.  Mammals present include the Tasmanian pademelon and long-nosed potoroo.  The Tasmanian tree skink is present.

See also

 South East Cape
 South West Cape
 List of islands of Tasmania

References

Islands of South West Tasmania
Protected areas of Tasmania
South West coast of Tasmania
Important Bird Areas of Tasmania
Tombolos